Vista Alegre do Alto is a municipality in the state of São Paulo in Brazil. The population is 8,989 (2020 est.) in an area of 95.43 km². The elevation is 619 m.

References

Municipalities in São Paulo (state)